Attawapiskat 91 is a First Nations reserve in Kenora District, northwestern Ontario. It was the main reserve of the Attawapiskat First Nation, but most have moved to the new reserve at Attawapiskat 91A.

External links
 Aboriginal Affairs and Northern Development Canada profile

Cree reserves in Ontario
Communities in Kenora District